Sophia Elizabeth De Morgan (née Frend; 10 November 1809–5 January 1892) was an English spiritualist writer and activist.

Early life
She was the eldest child of William Frend and his wife Sarah Blackburne. Her upbringing in London was unusual, her father taking her everywhere with him from a young age, and instructing her in philosophy and Hebrew. George Dyer was a friend of the family, as was Charles Lamb who wrote Sophia an acrostic poem based on her name. In 1820 the family moved from Blackfriars to Stoke Newington. Anna Letitia Barbauld, in her mid-70s, was a neighbour of the Frends, and Sophia at age 11 took part in some of her taxing games.

Ada Lovelace
In 1828 Sophia began tutoring Ada Lovelace. Lady Byron, Ada's mother, took advice on her daughter's education from William Frend, and Ada was tutored also by William King and Arabella Lawrence, from about 1830. Sophia had to overcome reservations about Ada, whom she didn't like.

The Frends moved back to central London—Tavistock Square—in 1831. Around 1832, Sophia expressed scepticism about a phrenological reading of Ada's head, by James De Ville, that had been arranged by her mother. In June 1833 Ada visited Charles Babbage and saw his difference engine, and Sophia reported that she had understood the principle of the machine. Sophia became a confidante of Lady Byron, on family matters.

Activism
Around 1835 Lady Byron brought Sophia onto the committee of the Children's Friend Society. In 1849 she was involved in the "Ladies' College" project of Elizabeth Jesser Reid. It is thought that she acted as secretary to early meetings of the group, but later withdrew because of bad health.

The De Morgans came to know Elizabeth Fry, who was under a misapprehension that Augustus was William Morgan the noted actuary. The introduction was through Lady Byron. Through Fry, Sophia became involved in prison and workhouse reform. She was also an anti-slavery and women's suffrage advocate.

Spiritualist
Her views on spiritualism adapted the philosophy of Emanuel Swedenborg, and influenced in particular Evelyn Pickering, who married her son William. She was impressed most, in table-turning, by the medium Daniel Dunglas Home.

Works
From Matter to Spirit: the result of ten years' experience in spirit manifestations (1863), as "C.D."
Augustus De Morgan (1882)
Threescore Years and Ten: Reminiscences of the late Sophia Elizabeth De Morgan (1895), edited by Mary De Morgan

A play parodying De Morgan's Elements of Algebra (1835), which was a precursor of the abstract algebra approach, survives in manuscript in Sophia's handwriting. It is attributed to her, or her father.

Family
Sophia married Augustus De Morgan on 3 August 1837, unconventionally for the period at the registry office in St Pancras. He had been a neighbour of the Frends in Upper Gower Street since 1831, but by the time of the marriage had known them for ten years. The couple had seven children, including William Frend De Morgan, George Campbell De Morgan the mathematician, and Mary De Morgan.

There were three sons of the marriage, with Edward who married Ada Margaret Wright, and four daughters, one of whom married:

Anne Isabella, married Reginald Edward Thompson, a physician, and was mother of Reginald Campbell Thompson

Elizabeth Alice (1853) and Helena Christiana (1870) died of tuberculosis.

Notes

1809 births
1892 deaths
English biographers
English spiritualists
Writers from London